Errol Spence Jr. (born March 3, 1990) is an American professional boxer. He is currently a unified welterweight world champion, having held the IBF title since 2017, the WBC title since 2019, and the WBA (Super) since 2022. As an amateur, in the welterweight division, he won three consecutive United States national championships and represented the U.S. at the 2012 Olympics, where he reached the quarter-finals. In 2015, Spence was named Prospect of the Year by ESPN.

As of May 2022, Spence is ranked as the world's third best active boxer, pound for pound, by ESPN, fourth by The Ring magazine, Boxing Writers Association of America and TBRB, and fifth by BoxRec. He is also ranked as the world's best active welterweight by The Ring, and TBRB, and second by BoxRec, and ESPN. His knockout-to-win ratio stands at 78%.

Amateur career
In 2009, Spence won the U.S. National Golden Gloves, and also won three consecutive national amateur welterweight championships from 2009 to 2011, all in the welterweight division. Spence reached the quarter-finals at the 2011 World Championships, losing to Serik Sapiyev.

Spence lost in the quarter finals of the 2012 London Olympics to Andrey Zamkovoy and turned professional shortly afterwards.

He ended his amateur career with a record of 135–12.

Professional career

Early career 
On 9 November 2012, a 22 year old Spence made his professional debut at the Fantasy Springs Casino in Indio, California in a scheduled 4 round bout against 19 year old Jonathan Garcia. Spence knocked Garcia down and out in the 3rd round. In December 2012, Spence knocked out Richard Andrews at the Sports Arena in Los Angeles, California, which was part of undercard for Amir Khan's comeback fight against Carlos Molina.

Spence fought eight times in 2013, being victorious in all of them, winning six inside the distance. He was taken the distance in an eight-round bout in October by Emmanuel Lartei Lartey. The fight was rather one-sided, with all judges scoring the fight 79–73 in favor of Spence. By the end of 2013, Spence had won all of his 10 professional fights, 8 of them by way of knockout.

Spence made his Showtime television debut on 27 June 2014 at the Hard Rock Hotel in Las Vegas in a 10-round fight against Ronald Cruz. Spence was taken the distance and won a shutout unanimous decision.

On 13 December 2014, Spence beat Javier Castro by TKO in the 5th round at the MGM Grand Hotel and Casino in Las Vegas.

Rise up the ranks 
On 11 April 2015, Spence defeated Samuel Vargas by TKO in Round 4 of 10 in a Premier Boxing Champions fight card at Barclays Center in Brooklyn, New York, bringing his record to 16–0. On May 16, it was announced that Spence would feature on the undercard of Shawn Porter vs. Adrien Broner on June 20 at the MGM Grand Arena. Spence defeated Phil Lo Greco (26-1, 14 KOs) via 3rd-round TKO. Spence was originally scheduled to fight Roberto García. García backed out of the fight three days before the card due to weight issues. Spence landed 73 of 142 punched thrown (51%) and Lo Greco landed 19 of 132 (14%).

Spence next fought on the undercard of Stevenson-Karpency against Chris van Heerden at the Ricoh Coliseum. The referee stopped the fight in round 8, after Spence knocked down van Heerden twice in round 7.

In October 2015 it was announced that Spence would fight at The Bomb Factory in Dallas on November 28 against Mexican boxer Alejandro Barrera (28-2, 18 KOs). Spence defeated Barrera via 5th-round TKO. This was an IBF eliminator for the number 2 spot in their welterweight contender rankings. Spence was ahead on all three judges scorecards (40-36, 3 times).

Spence was named 2015 ESPN.com prospect of the year.

Spence vs. Algieri 
On 10 March 2016, it was announced that Spence would fight former light welterweight titlist Chris Algieri at the Barclays Center in Brooklyn on 16 April, his biggest fight to date. The fight was scheduled for 10 rounds. In front of a pro-Algieri 7,628 crowd, Spence became the first boxer to stop Algieri. This was Spence's seventh straight knockout. The end came when Spence delivered a left hook to Algieri's face. The hard shot sent Algieri straight to the canvas and referee Benjy Esteves waived the count. After the bout, Spence said "Kell Brook knows what time it is. We got to get in the ring and fight.". IBF later stated that Spence must have a final eliminator before he is declared mandatory challenger. . For the fight, Spence earned $225,000 whilst Algieri earned $325,000. CompuBox punch statistics showed that Spence landed 96 of 311 punches (31%), whereas Algieri landed 36 of 114 thrown (32%). The fight averaged 1.482 million viewers on NBC.

Spence vs. Bundu 
On 16 May 2016, Spence denied that his team turned down a fight against Brook, which had been previously insinuated by Eddie Hearn, Brook's promoter. Spence said that the IBF had ordered him to fight their #3 contender Konstantin Ponomarev in order to become the mandatory challenger to Brook. Although there were no agreements to fight, on June 9, Ponomarev injured his hand, forcing him out of the eliminator. Instead, it was confirmed that Spence Jr. would fight IBF #7 Leonard Bundu (33-1-2, 12 KOs) in the eliminator on August 21 at the Ford Amphitheater. The fight would be aired on a Sunday night edition of Premier Boxing Champions on NBC.

Spence focused on breaking down Bundu from the start. After five one-sided rounds, Spence backed Bundu against the ropes and connected with an uppercut that dropped Bundu. Referee Johnny Callas waved off the fight without starting a count. After the fight, Spence Jr. reiterated his desire of becoming IBF World champion stating, "I definitely want my shot at Kell Brook and his title, I want him next. If he vacates or gets stripped, then I'll fight for his vacant title. I've paid my dues." For the fight, Spence received $250,000 compared to Bundu's $30,000 purse. The fight drew 4.8 million viewers on NBC and peaked at 6.34 million. This was the highest TV audience for boxing in over 10 years in the United States.

IBF welterweight champion

Spence vs. Brook 
In January 2017, IBF welterweight champion Kell Brook and his team were in talks with Amir Khan over a potential fight, whilst also keeping the mandatory fight with Spence as second choice. During negotiations, Khan urged Brook to fight Spence first and eventually talks broke down between Brook and Khan. Brook's promoter Eddie Hearn mentioned talks were already ongoing with Spence's manager Al Haymon for a fight to take place possibly in the UK in May. Hearn received an extension from the IBF for negotiations between himself and TGB Promotions boss Tom Brown, as they were progressing. The purse bid for the fight was set for 7 February by the IBF. On February 1, Hearn claimed that Brook will be keeping his title and make the defense against Spence and that he had reached out to Spence's team, to no reply. He assumed that they wanted the fight to go to purse bids. Spence said that he had no problem travelling to the UK for the fight, regardless of negotiations. With a deal close to being reached a day before the purse bids, the IBF granted a week extension, pushing the purse bid back 7 days. On February 13, a deal was reached for the fight to take place in Sheffield on 20 May 2017. At a press conference at Bramall Lane, Sheffield on March 22, the fight was officially announced to take place on May 27, 2017, live on Sky Box Office in the UK and Showtime in the US.

In front of 27,000 fans, Spence dropped and eventually stopped Brook to win the IBF welterweight title after 11 rounds. In a fight where mostly power shots were landed, Spence threw combinations to the head and to the body, gradually wearing down Brook. Brook did well working the counter and landed his own shots to the body. In round 10, Spence cornered Brook against the ropes and unloaded some heavy power shots, which caused Brook to take a knee. In round 11, Brook motioned many times that he couldn't see through his left eye and voluntarily took a knee. The referee started the 10 count, which Brook was unable to beat, giving him back-to-back defeats and his first as a welterweight. At the time of stoppage, all three judges had Spence ahead on their scorecards (97-92, 96–93, 95–94). Although he won the fight, Spence admitted it was not his best performance, "I give myself a B−. I was a little bit off with my offense and defense, but I give Kell a lot of credit. This is what true champions do. You go anywhere to fight." Spence landed 246 of 633 punches thrown (39%) while Brook landed 136 of 442 (31%). The fight was broadcast in the afternoon in the US on Showtime and averaged 291,000 viewers, peaking at 337,000 viewers. These were considered low numbers, even for an afternoon showing, possibly due to it being a holiday weekend. For the fight, Spence earned around £1 million and Brook earned a guaranteed £3 million.

Spence vs. Peterson 
On 3 October 2017, Lamont Peterson (35-3-1, 17 KOs) vacated his WBA (Regular) title in hopes of challenging Spence for the latter's IBF title. Dan Rafael revealed that Spence was promised a $3.5 million purse from his manager Al Haymon for his next fight. On October 13, it was reported that terms would be finalised within a week. The fight was tentatively scheduled for Spence's 28th birthday, 13 January 2018, against Peterson. The event would be aired on Showtime. Peterson last saw action when he dethroned David Avanesyan in February 2017. The fight was confirmed on 14 October, with Barclays Center the front-runner to land the fight. At a presser, Spence spoke fondly of Peterson, "He's somebody I looked up to in the amateurs and I learned a lot from. I had a training camp with him at the Olympic training center. So he's a guy I really look up to. He's one of my favorite fighters. He'll fight anybody. I've never known him to say no to a fight. I'm looking forward to it. He's got true grit. He's a real fighter. He's a guy who gives it his all and has a big heart." On November 5, it was reported the fight was confirmed to take place at Barclays Center in Brooklyn on January 20, 2018.

On fight night, in front of 12,107 fans, Spence broke Peterson down mentally and physically eventually forcing Peterson's trainer Barry Hunter to stop the fight a second into round 8. Peterson was dropped in round 5 from a left hand by Spence. Peterson beat the count and looked unsteady, surviving the round. Peterson took a lot of punishment, but managed to fire back some offence of his own before the round ended. Peterson's face looked swollen and his eyes were puffy from Spence's hard shots. Spence also worked the body from the opening bell. After round 6, Peterson knew he was behind on the scorecards and indicated to his trainer, who said he would give him a few more rounds. In the post-fight interviews, Spence said, "I want to thank Lamont. A lot guys turned down the fight, and he took like a real warrior, and I commend him for that. My coach [Derrick James] came with a great game plan, and I just followed through with it. Keep my range, keep my composure." Spence admitted he would need to work on his defence a little. When interviewer Jim Gray asked Hunter about the stoppage, he replied, "It was really hard [to stop the fight], but if you know Lamont, you know he was not going to give up. So I had to stop it. At the end of the day this is my son right here. And there's nothing more valuable than his well being. If it comes to him or winning, I pick him. I care about him." After the fight, Spence called out unified champion Keith Thurman, referring him to 'sometime'. At the time of stoppage, all three judges had their scorecards at 70-62 for Spence.

According to CompuBox stats, Spence landed 161 of 526 punches thrown (30%), and Peterson landed only 45 of his 158 thrown (28%). For the fight, Spence had an official purse of $1.2 million and Peterson's purse was $600,000. The fight averaged 637,000 viewers and peaked at 695,000 viewers on Showtime.

Spence vs. Ocampo 
On January 23, 2018, the IBF sent a letter to TGB Promotions ordering Spence to make a mandatory defence against unbeaten prospect Carlos Ocampo (22-0, 13 KOs) next. Zanfer Promotions, who promote Ocampo were also notified and were given until February 22 to reach a deal before purse bids take place. Because Ocampo was not rated in the top 2 in the IBF rankings at the time, at purse bids, he would be entitled to 15% rather than the 25% that a mandatory challenger receives. On January 24, Showtime announced that Spence would next fight on June 16 in Dallas, Texas. On February 24, according to ESPN, the IBF ordered purse bids to take place on March 6. Four days later, it was revealed that both sides had reached a deal. On April 30, an official press release confirmed that the bout would take place at the Ford Center at The Star in Frisco. In front of a sellout crowd of 12,604 fans, Spence knocked Ocampo out in round 1 to retain his IBF title. In response to some body shots from Ocampo, Spence hit back with a hard left to the body that sent Ocampo to the canvas. Referee Lawrence Cole made the 10 count as Ocampo tried to get up, but was in too much pain. The time of the stoppage was at 3:00 of round 1. The knockout for Spence was his 11th consecutive stoppage since 2014. Spence stated he wanted to unify the division by going after the winner of the Shawn Porter vs. Danny Garcia, Keith Thurman and Terence Crawford. After the bout, Spence said, "I was a little disappointed. I wanted to give the crowd their money's worth. I wanted him to sustain a bit and give him some punishment, but the body shot got him and I dropped him." Spence wanted to go at least 5 rounds. According to Ocampo, it was overconfidence that caught up to him and ended his world title challenge. For the fight, Spence made $1.2 million and Ocampo was given a $75,000 purse. Numerous Cowboys players were in attendance, including quarterback Dak Prescott. The fight averaged 683,000 viewers and peaked at 726,000 viewers on Showtime, an increase from his previous bout.

Spence vs. Mikey Garcia 
On October 25, 2018, BoxingScene.com reported that negotiations between Spence and Mikey Garcia (39-0,30 KOs) were progressing, with the fight likely to take place in February 2019 on Showtime PPV. Garcia first began to call out Spence for a fight before he defeated and unified the lightweight division in July. On October 30, Garcia vacated his IBF lightweight title and the purse bid for the potential Richard Commey fight was cancelled. On November 13, PBC made an official announcement for their 2019 schedule. It was announced that the fight between Garcia and Spence would take place at the welterweight limit at the AT&T Stadium in Arlington, Texas on March 16, 2019, exclusively on FOX PPV. Many fans reacted to the fight being announced. Some welcoming the fight and praising Garcia for 'daring to be great' and some fans believed that the size difference would be too much as Spence is considered a big welterweight.

On the night though, Spence completely outclassed and dominated Garcia, using his superior reach to constantly land jabs to the head and body from a distance, landing 108 over the course of the fight. Garcia tried to close the distance, but with Spence's weight and height advantage, he was able to completely dominate Garcia even in the pocket. In rounds 8 and 9, Spence landed over 100 punches in two rounds, with the majority being power shots, constantly using lead hooks and uppercuts on the increasing backing up Garcia. In total, Spence landed 345 punches to Garcia's 75. Garcia was unable to land double-digit punches in any of the twelve rounds. The scorecards on the night read 120-107 and 120–108, twice, to give Spence a perfect 12 round shutout victory. After the fight, Spence was joined in the ring by eight-division world champion Manny Pacquiao. Both stated that they would love to fight each other next.

Unified welterweight champion

Spence vs. Porter 

Spence fought two-time welterweight world champion Shawn Porter on September 28, 2019, in a unification bout with the IBF and WBC welterweight titles on the line. Porter tried to rough up Spence from the get go, knowing Spence is the superior boxer, which made for an intriguing and an action-packed fight. Spence knocked Porter down in the eleventh round en route to a split decision victory, with the judges scoring it 116–111, 116–111, 112–115. It was arguably a fight of the year candidate.

Spence vs. Danny Garcia 

In his first fight since crashing his car in October 2019, Spence fought former two-weight world champion Danny Garcia on December 5, 2020 (postponed from November 21st), on PPV at AT&T Stadium in Arlington, Texas with Spence's IBF and WBC welterweight titles on the line. Garcia was ranked #2 by the WBC and #6 by The Ring at welterweight. He was awarded a unanimous decision victory with scores of 116–112, 116-112 and 117–111, and retained his titles.

Cancelled bout vs. Manny Pacquiao 
On May 21, 2021, eight-division world champion Manny Pacquiao made the unexpected announcement on his social media that he and Spence would meet in the ring on August 21 in Las Vegas to face each other on Fox PPV. PBC and Fox confirmed the news, and it was reported that both men have signed contracts to face each other. The two men had previously already met more than two years prior on March 16, 2019, in the ring following Spence's unanimous decision victory over Mikey Garcia in Arlington, Texas, when both Pacquiao and Spence indicated they would relish the chance to fight each other. On June 23, the venue was officially announced as the T-Mobile Arena. However, on August 10, Spence was forced to pull out, after suffering a retinal tear to his left eye. He was replaced by Yordenis Ugás, with Ugás' WBA (Super) welterweight title being on the line.

Spence vs. Ugás 

After successfully defending his title against Pacquiao, Ugás petitioned the WBA for a special permit to bypass a mandatory defense against Eimantas Stanionis in order to face Spence in a title unification bout. The petition was denied by the WBA on October 20, 2021, who stated: "...we are in special circumstances to resolve extraordinary situations, such as the champion reduction in every division to have only one champion". Accordingly, Ugás and Stanionis were given a 30-day period to negotiate the terms of their bout. As they were unable to come to terms, a purse bid was ordered for December 9, with a minimal bid of $200,000. The winning bid would be split 75/25 in favor of Ugas as the reigning titlist. On December 19, 2021, WBA President Gilberto J. Mendoza has confirmed that the Spence-Ugas was approved as Stanionis was willing to step aside. The unification bout was officially announced on February 8, 2022. It was scheduled to headline a  Showtime pay per view card on April 16, which will take place at the AT&T Stadium in Arlington, Texas. Spence won the fight by a tenth-round technical knockout. The fight was stopped on the advice of the ringside physician, due to Ugas’ severely swollen right eye. Spence was leading on all three of the judges' scorecards at the time of the stoppage, with scores of 88–82, 88–82 and 88–83. Spence landed more total punches (216 to 96) and more power punches (192 to 77) than Ugas.

Spence vs. Thurman
Spence Jr. and the WBO welterweight champion Terence Crawford came to an agreement on “all material terms” for a title unification, which was expected to take place on November 19. The agreement included a bilateral rematch clause, with the winner of the bout earning the majority of the revenue in the rematch. Two months later, it was revealed by both camps that negotiations had fallen through and they would be pursuing different fights. Following this, the WBC ordered Spence Jr. to face Keith Thurman in a mandatory title defense.

Personal life
Errol Spence Jr. is of Jamaican descent through his father and  African-American descent through his mother. He was born on Long Island, NY, but has spent the majority of his life living in Dallas, Texas. He is the father of two daughters and a son.

Car crash
Spence was involved in a single-vehicle accident at 2:53 AM on October 10, 2019, in his hometown of Dallas, Texas, and was hospitalized in the intensive care unit. According to Dallas police, Spence's Ferrari 488 Spider was "traveling at a high rate of speed" and then "veered left over the center median onto the southbound lanes and flipped multiple times, ejecting the driver, who was not wearing a seatbelt." Spence sustained facial lacerations, but no broken bones. Earlier in the night, he had been drinking alcohol. He was released from the hospital six days later and was charged with a DWI, a class-B misdemeanor by the Dallas Police Department. Spence posted on Instagram "No broken bones I'm a savage!!" but deleted this post after receiving backlash, as fans stated he was lucky to be alive and noted that he could have seriously hurt others due to his drunk driving. Spence avoided jail time and received probation.

Professional boxing record

Pay-per-view bouts

See also 
List of world welterweight boxing champions
List of southpaw stance boxers

References

External links

Errol Spence Jr. profile at Premier Boxing Champions
 Twitter
Errol Spence Jr. - Profile, News Archive & Current Rankings at Box.Live

1990 births
Living people
Boxers from Texas
Sportspeople from Dallas
Boxers at the 2012 Summer Olympics
Olympic boxers of the United States
American male boxers
Winners of the United States Championship for amateur boxers
National Golden Gloves champions
American people of Jamaican descent
Southpaw boxers
International Boxing Federation champions
World Boxing Council champions
World Boxing Association champions
World welterweight boxing champions